Daniel E. Watrous was a settler, lawyer, and state politician in Alabama. He served in the Alabama State Senate representing Shelby County, Alabama and Bibb County, Alabama.

He was born in Connecticut. He moved to Alabama from Vermont and was a Whig.

References

Alabama state senators
People from Connecticut
Year of birth missing
Year of death unknown